Castlegate is a neighborhood in southeastern Lexington, Kentucky, United States. its boundaries are Alumni Drive to the north and east, Chinoe Road to the west, and a combination of Colt Neck Lane and Lakeside Drive to the south.

Neighborhood statistics

 Area: 
 Population: 208
 Population density: 2,083 people per square mile
 Median household income: $55,010

References

Neighborhoods in Lexington, Kentucky